Vartaşenqışlaq (also, Vartashenkyshlak, Vartaşen-Qışlaq, and Vartashen-Kyshlak) is a village in the Oghuz Rayon of Azerbaijan.

References 

Populated places in Oghuz District